HMN may refer to:

Transport 
 Hamilton railway station, New South Wales in Australia
 Hamilton station (Ohio) in the United States
 Hemmen-Dodewaard railway station, in the Netherlands
 Humayun railway station, in Pakistan
 Holloman Air Force Base, in New Mexico, United States
 Homerton railway station in London

Other uses 
 Health Metrics Network, an international health organization
 Hereditary motor neuropathies
hmn, three-letter ISO 639-3 code for the Hmong language
 Hmongic languages, spoken in China, Laos, and Vietnam
 Isocetane (2,2,4,4,6,8,8-heptamethylnonane)